The Guinea national under-20 football team is the under-20 football team of Guinea. It is controlled by the Guinean Football Federation.

Competitive record

FIFA U-20 World Cup record

Current squad

References

African national under-20 association football teams
under-20